Alfred Watson may refer to:

Alfred Watson (actuary) (1870–1936), British government actuary
Alf Watson (1907–1992), Australian athlete
Alfred A. Watson (1818–1905), Episcopal bishop of East Carolina, United States
Alfred Michael Watson (1908–1990), Roman Catholic bishop of Erie, United States
Alfred Watson (cricketer) (1888–1957), Tasmanian cricket captain in 1927/28
Alf Watson (rugby league), 1930s British rugby league footballer
Rat Watson (1894–1965), American football player